6 Ballygunge Place is a Bengali restaurant chain established in 2003. Its main branch is located at Ballygunge, Kolkata, India at a British Raj mansion. It has other branches in Bangalore and Guwahati. Following a closure for a short period after the Puja celebrations in 2015, the restaurant has undergone substantial renovation with two additional floors, and it was reopened in December 2015. Decorated with haath-pakha (Pankha are hand fans of the Indian subcontinent) décor in the entire ground floor it has the elegance of a Durga puja pandal (a decorated hall during the Durga Puja celebrations) or a setting for a period film.

History 

6 Ballygunge Place is the first Bengali restaurant chain. This is also the first retail outlet in India to register its trademark as an address. In 2011 the restaurant management decided to start branches in London and Manhattan. In 2015 the restaurant was renovated. The restaurant chain is run by an umbrella organization, the Savourites Hospitality.

Architectural features
The refurbished restaurant, which opened in December 2015 following three months of restoration work done at a cost of Rs 140 million, appears as an integrated unit with three floors and a rooftop space. The renovation was done by the architect Abin Chaudhuri. The first two floors, including the ground floor of the restaurant, provide dining space for 155 guests. The second floor has a banquet hall which can accommodate 100 to 120, plus a rooftop area that can accommodate an additional 55 guests. The interior decor, credited to Sharbari Datta, along with the seating arrangements, are typically Bengali in style with rich colours of white, gold and grey, termed as "Bangaliana."

Ground floor
On the ground floor, the reception-cum-waiting lounge features a large drawing room fashioned like a conventional "thinking Bengali household". It is fitted with teak wood chairs, Victorian-style corner tables, and displays of silver artifacts.  This hall has an impressive large haath-pakha (hand fan) suspended at the centre, a feature repeated in the other three floors as well. The walls, painted in bright yellow, are hung with paintings by the artist Mamoni Chitrakar from Pingla, which are in the form of images of cat-and-fish on Kalighat saras (convex shaped pitchers made of earth). A private dining room for 10 to 12 diners, also designed in the Victorian style, has a large patachitra by Mamoni Chitrakar extending from floor to ceiling, depicting images of rural women.

First floor
The first floor has a large space formed into five dining areas, with chessboard-patterned flooring, a high ceiling, attached balconies, louvers  (known as khorkhori janala in Bengali), and arched doorways. Art decor on the walls is of Tagore's Sahaj Path drawings, patachitra, and many other art forms.

Restaurant cuisine
The restaurant cuisine includes Bengali and Continental dishes, such as grilled fish, Chicken A La Kiev, and roasted lamb. Lunch service is a six-course buffet.

See also 
 The Kitchen of Joy (a Bengali-restaurant in Bangalore)

References 

Restaurant chains in India
Bengali restaurants
Companies based in Kolkata
Restaurants in Kolkata
2003 establishments in West Bengal
Restaurants established in 2003
Indian companies established in 2003